Pterolophia sinensis is a species of beetle in the family Cerambycidae. It was described by Léon Fairmaire in 1900.

References

sinensis
Beetles described in 1900